Advance and Vanquish is the second studio album by Canadian heavy metal band 3 Inches of Blood. It was released on September 28, 2004, and was their first release by Roadrunner Records. It is the only release by the band to feature bassist and drummer Brian Redman and Matt Wood respectively, and the last to feature original guitarists Sunny Dhak and Bobby Froese who later went on to reform their previous band Pride Tiger. The cover art was illustrated by Edward Repka who has also designed album covers for such acclaimed bands as Megadeth and Death.

Track listing

Song meanings 
Through interviews, vocalist Jamie Hooper has revealed the meanings and themes of the songs from Advance and Vanquish:
 "Fear on the Bridge" is the first part of a pirate trilogy entitled "Upon the Boiling Sea". The second part is the sixth track, "Lord of the Storm" and the third is the thirteenth track, "Isle of Eternal Despair". The trilogy is mainly about greed and punishment and was inspired by the music of German power metal band Running Wild. A fourth track entitled "Die For Gold (Upon The Boiling Sea IV)"  also appears on the album Long Live Heavy Metal released on March 15, 2012.
 "Deadly Sinners" is about a fictionalized glory of heavy metal, and those who unsuccessfully attempt to destroy it.
 "Revenge Is a Vulture" is "about something that you've set out to finally accomplish," as stated by vocalist Jamie Hooper.
 "Dominion of Deceit" is the band's "pagan power song," also stated by Hooper. It tells a story about heathens uniting to rise against the sanctity of the church.
 "Premonition of Pain" is about a soothsayer who alerts his king about fore coming dangers, but the king would not listen and is defeated because of his own folly.
 "Wykydtron" is about a cyborg created to serve mankind, who eventually becomes out of control. The story of the name of the song as follows: "An unnamed band that opened for us wasn't very good," explains Hooper. "Somebody ripped their name off a poster and wrote in 'Wykydtron.' I don't know what it means, but it sounded cool and futuristic. So we developed it into a space-themed tale of cyborg warfare."
 "Swordmaster" is about the revenge of a knight.
 "Axes of Evil" is based on human greed. In the words of Hooper, "people with good intentions, once given the power sometimes don't know what to do with it, and that's where that one is coming from." Similarities can also be drawn to the human storyline of the game WarCraft 3, which Pipes has commented as having influenced the song.
 "Crazy Nights" was written by vocalist Cam Pipes about a good time the band had in London, where they got into a bar fight in New Cross.
 "Destroy the Orcs" was inspired by the work of J. R. R. Tolkien, and also about revenge.
 "The Phantom of the Crimson Cloak" is about a creature that feeds on human flesh and hunts and kills anyone who crosses its path in the night.

Personnel 
 Cam Pipes – clean vocals
 Jamie Hooper – screaming vocals
 Sunny Dhak – lead guitar
 Bobby Froese – rhythm guitar
 Brian Redman – bass
 Matt Wood – drums
 Brian Deck – drum technician
 Mike Gitter – a&r
 Neil Kernon – producer, engineer
 UE Nastasi – mastering
 Edward Repka – cover art
 Colin Richardson – mixing
 Dan Turner – mixing assistant

Trivia 
 "Destroy the Orcs" is a re-recording of a song from the band's debut album. A second song from their debut album, "Ride Darkhorse, Ride", was also re-recorded during these sessions, but has yet to be released.
 The album's only single, "Deadly Sinners", is featured in the video game Tony Hawk's Underground 2, although the version heard on the game is a demo, containing no lead guitar solo and having rougher vocal tracks. The album version can be heard in Saints Row 2, on the metal radio station, Krunch 106.66. The song is also featured in the PlayStation 3/Xbox 360 videogame Brütal Legend, along with "Destroy the Orcs". The "headbangers" from Brütal Legend also appear to be styled on the army from this album cover. The song is also used in a parody video by  Brandon Hardesty in his "Extreme Toothbrushing" video. YouTube user "indrancole3" also uses the song in his "EXTREME MOVIE WATCHING", "EXTREME BREAKFAST" and "EXTREME EXORCISM" videos.

References 

2004 albums
3 Inches of Blood albums
Albums produced by Neil Kernon
Albums with cover art by Ed Repka
Roadrunner Records albums